The 1980 Italian local elections were held on 8 and 9 June. The elections were held in 6,575 municipalities and 86 provinces.

Municipal elections
Summary of the results of all the provincial capital municipalities except Novara, Genoa, Pavia, Belluno, Trieste, Pordenone, Ravenna, Siena, Ancona, Ascoli Piceno, Rome, Bari and Foggia.

Provincial elections
Summary of the results of all the provinces except Aosta, Pavia, Trento, Bolzano, Gorizia, Ravenna, Rome, Viterbo and Foggia.

References

External links

1980 elections in Italy
 
Municipal elections in Italy
June 1980 events in Europe